Kenneth B. Auletta (born April 23, 1942)  is an American author, a political columnist for the New York Daily News, and media critic for The New Yorker.

Early life and education

The son of an Italian American father and a Jewish American mother, Auletta grew up in the Coney Island section of Brooklyn, New York, where he attended Abraham Lincoln High School. He graduated from the State University of New York at Oswego and received his M.A. in political science from the Maxwell School of Citizenship and Public Affairs at Syracuse University.

Writing career

While in graduate school, Auletta taught and trained Peace Corps volunteers. He "got bored in a Ph.D political science program and left to be a gofer and write speeches in politics; then on to serve in government", then working for then-Senator Robert F. Kennedy's 1968 presidential campaign before serving as campaign manager for former Administrator of the Small Business Administration Howard J. Samuels's failed 1974 gubernatorial campaign. From 1971 to 1974, he also served as the first executive director of the now-defunct New York City Off-Track Betting Corporation under the aegis of Samuels (who was concurrently appointed as the Corporation's chairman).

After Samuels's defeat, Auletta became a daily reporter for the New York Post in 1974. Following that, he was a writer for The Village Voice, and a politics writer at New York. He began contributing to The New Yorker in 1977, writing a two-part article on New York City Mayor Ed Koch in 1978. He also wrote a weekly political column for the New York Daily News and was a political commentator on WCBS-TV. In 1986, he received the Gerald Loeb Award for Large Newspapers. He was the guest editor of the 2002 edition of The Best Business Stories of the Year.

Auletta started writing the "Annals of Communications" profiles for The New Yorker in 1992. His 2001 profile of Ted Turner, "The Lost Tycoon", won a National Magazine Award for Profile Writing. He is the author of twelve books, his first being The Streets Were Paved With Gold (1979). His other books include The Underclass (1983), Greed and Glory on Wall Street: The Fall of The House of Lehman (1986), Three Blind Mice: How the TV Networks Lost Their Way (1991), The Highwaymen: Warriors of the Information Superhighway (1997), and World War 3.0: Microsoft and Its Enemies (2001). His book Backstory: Inside the Business of News (2003) is a collection of his columns from The New Yorker. Five of his first 11 books were national bestsellers, including Googled: The End of the World as We Know It (2009).

In late 2014 he published a profile of Elizabeth Holmes and the company she founded, Theranos. While largely uncritical, the profile did note an absence of clinical tests and peer-reviewed studies supporting Theranos' alleged scientific innovations; it also characterized Holmes' explanation of the Theranos blood-testing process as "comically vague". Former Wall Street Journal reporter John Carreyrou has credited Auletta's profile for stimulating his initial interest in Theranos.

His twelfth book, Frenemies: The Epic Disruption of the Ad Business (And Everything Else), was published in 2018. It described how advertising and marketing, with worldwide spending of up to $2 trillion, and without the subsidies of which most media, including Google and Facebook, would eventually perish, being already a victim of disruption.

He published his thirteenth book, Hollywood Ending: Harvey Weinstein and the Culture of Silence, a biography of former entertainment mogul and convicted sex offender Harvey Weinstein, 2022.

Auletta was among the first to popularize the idea of the so-called "information superhighway" with his February 22, 1993, New Yorker profile of Barry Diller, in which he described how Diller used his Apple PowerBook to anticipate the advent of the Internet and our digital future. He has profiled the leading figures and companies of the Information Age, including Bill Gates, Reed Hastings, Sheryl Sandberg, Rupert Murdoch, John Malone, and the New York Times.

Auletta has been named a Library Lion Honoree by the New York Public Library. He has won numerous journalism awards, and was selected as one of the twentieth century's top one hundred business journalists. He has served as a Pulitzer Prize juror, and for four decades has been a judge of the annual national Livingston Award for young journalists. He has twice served as a board member of International PEN, and was a longtime trustee and member of the Executive Committee of The Public Theater / New York Shakespeare Festival. Auletta is a member of the Council on Foreign Relations.

Personal life
Before October 2021, Auletta had an apartment on Lenox Hill in Manhattan with his wife, Amanda "Binky" Urban, a literary agent. As of 2013, the couple also owned a house in Bridgehampton, New York. They have a daughter.

Portrayals in popular culture
On 11 September 1995, Auletta was satirized as "Ken Fellata" in The New Republic by Jacob Weisberg and later New Yorker colleague Malcolm Gladwell.

Auletta is a commentator in Where's My Roy Cohn?

Works

Books

Essays and reporting

 
  a Profile of Rupert Murdoch
 
 
  A profile of Howell Raines
 
 
  A profile of Saad Mohseni
 
 
  Henry Blodget
 
 
 
Elizabeth Holmes, CEO of Theranos

References

External links

 Ken Auletta's web site
 Ken Auletta - The New Yorker
 Oral history interview with Ken Auletta, circa 1978

Booknotes interview with Auletta on Three Blind Mice, October 6, 1991.
In Depth interview with Auletta, February 1, 2004
C-SPAN Q&A interview with Auletta, November 1, 2009
 Interview with Ken Auletta, 16 July 2014, George Mason University Oral History Program
 Abstract to 16 July 2014 Interview with Ken Auletta
 

1942 births
Living people
Abraham Lincoln High School (Brooklyn) alumni
American business writers
American social sciences writers
Jewish American writers
American writers of Italian descent
People from Coney Island
State University of New York at Oswego alumni
The New Yorker people
The New Yorker staff writers
Maxwell School of Citizenship and Public Affairs alumni
Journalists from New York City
20th-century American male writers
21st-century American male writers
20th-century American non-fiction writers
21st-century American non-fiction writers
American male non-fiction writers
Gerald Loeb Award winners for Large Newspapers
Carnegie Council for Ethics in International Affairs
21st-century American Jews